Archaeosphaeroides is an extinct genus of bacteria from the Ediacaran.

References

 G Bignot, 1983: Elements of Micropalaeontology, p.165
 Lessem, D., & Sovak, S., 1999: Dinosaurs to Dodos: An Encyclopedia of Extinct Animals

Ediacaran life
Bacteria genera
Cyanobacteria genera